The 1959–60 Kansas Jayhawks men's basketball team represented the University of Kansas during the 1959–60 college men's basketball season.

Roster
Wayne Hightower
Bill Bridges
Jerry Gardner
Al Donaghue
Bob Hickman
Dee Ketchum
Butch Myers
Al Correll
Jim Hoffman
Dick Gisel
Bill Goetze
Bill Elstun
Larry Sterlin
Ken Hensley
Howard Parker
Pete Woodward

Schedule

References

Kansas Jayhawks men's basketball seasons
Kansas
Kansas
Kansas
Kansas